Lost Star or Lost Stars may refer to:

Literature
 The Lost Stars (2012–2016), the military science fiction book series by John G. Hemry under the pen name Jack Campbell
 Star Wars: Lost Stars, a 2015 young adult science fiction novel by Claudia Gray
 Lost Stars, a 2019 novel in the Warriors: The Broken Code series by Erin Hunter

Music
 "Lost Stars", a 2014 original song performed by Maroon 5 frontman Adam Levine
 The Lost Star, a 2010 album by The Orchids

Other uses
 Alex Kidd: The Lost Stars, a 1986 arcade game
 The Raccoons and the Lost Star ("The Lost Star"), a 1983 animated telefilm in The Racoons fictional universe
 Rupert and the Lost Stars ("The Lost Stars"), a 2006 TV episode of Rupert Bear, Follow the Magic...
 The Lost Star, an 1884 painting by William-Adolphe Bouguereau of Merope the Pleiad

See also

 
 
 Lost (disambiguation)
 Star (disambiguation)
 Lost in the Stars (disambiguation)